I Saw Ben Barka Get Killed is a 2005 French-Moroccan film drama directed by Serge Le Péron and Saïd Smihi. The film is based on the Ben Barka affair.

Plot
In a Parisian apartment, police discover the body of Georges Figon, the man who broke the scandal of the Ben Barka affair, and undermined Gaullist power. A year earlier, Figon, tired of dubious deals and petty scams, is looking for a lucrative job. Close to the "milieu" (the criminal underworld) since his years in prison, he is given a big assignment: to produce a documentary about decolonization, written by Marguerite Duras and directed by Georges Franju, with the help of famous Moroccan dissident, Mehdi Ben Barka, who has been hired as an historical consultant. The film project is a trap.

Cast

 Charles Berling as Georges Figon
 Simon Abkarian as Mehdi Ben Barka
 Josiane Balasko as Marguerite Duras
 Jean-Pierre Léaud as Georges Franju
 Mathieu Amalric as Philippe Bernier
 Fabienne Babe as Anne-Marie Coffinet
 Azize Kabouche as Chtouki
 François Hadji-Lazaro as Le Ny
 Jean-Marie Winling as Pierre Lemarchand
 Franck Tiozzo as Georges Boucheseiche
 Jo Prestia as Dubail
 José María Blanco as The judge
 Georges Bigot as Inspector Louis Souchon
 Rony Kramer as Lopez
 Xavier Serrat as Voitot
 Brahim Aït El Kadi as Thami Azzemouri
 Mouna Fettou as Ghita Ben Barka
 Fayçal Khyari as Mohamed Oufkir
 Abdellatif Khamolli as Ahmed Dlimi
 Hubert Saint-Macary as The doctor

References

External links

2005 films
2005 drama films
French drama films
2000s French-language films
Moroccan drama films
2000s French films